Portus Magnus was a Roman port in western Mauretania Caesariensis. It was located near Roman Portus Divinus and actual Oran (Algeria).

History

Portus Magnus, spatio appellatus, civium Romanorum oppidum. (the locality is called "Portus Magnus", a city of Roman citizens). Plinius

Portus Magnus (Great Harbour) was even named "Arsenaria" under the Roman Empire (the name is the one that can be seen in its former coat of arms).

It has several Roman remains, mosaics, and artworks, which were deplaced to the museum of nearby Oran. During Roman times, the main exports from the area used to be grain and salt.

The city of Portus Magnus stood on a hill overlooking the ancient port. The inhabitants were mostly Roman citizens, working in commerce. The approximately  area was paved in part or leveled by landfills. From the ancient city remains some walls and buildings, some cisterns for rainwater, traces of streets and even a small Forum (50 × 40 meters).

Among the buildings there was -next to some Villas- probably a palatial resort of the 3rd century: inside there are remains of colonnades (porticus) and a spa. On one side of the Forum there was a small building that had once some marble countertops and was graced by a statue (like a small "Acropolis"). Behind the Curia there was a temple of unknown dedication and another very large: this second temple was dedicated to Venus, about 120 meters west of the Forum.

The Vandals destroyed Portus Magnus in 430 AD. Some evidences of Christian worships showed a small port activity even under the Byzantines, but the Arab conquest at the end of the seventh century seemed to have put a complete end to Portus Magnus.

During the French colonial times were discovered some beautiful mosaics of former Portus Magnus, in the place called Arzew by the French colonists.

See also
 Mauretania Caesariensis
 Arzew
Bethioua

References

Bibliography
 Mommsen, Theodore. The Provinces of the Roman Empire Section: Roman Africa. (Leipzig 1865; London 1866; London: Macmillan 1909; reprint New York 1996) Barnes & Noble. New York, 1996
 Reynell Morell, John. Algeria: The Topography and History, Political, Social, and Natural, of French Africa. Publisher N. Cooke. London, 1854

Archaeological sites in Algeria
Roman towns and cities in Mauretania Caesariensis
Ancient Berber cities